Apostrophes: A Book of Tributes to Masters of Music is a book written by Alfred Kreymborg and published by The Grafton Press, New York, in 1910.  It is a slim volume (with no page numbers), and comprises a series of short somewhat 'poetic' paragraphs addressed to various great composers.  There is an introductory apostrophe To Music, and then sections on the following composers: Giovanni Pierluigi da Palestrina, Henry Purcell, Christoph Willibald Gluck, Wolfgang Amadeus Mozart, Johann Sebastian Bach, Joseph Haydn, Ludwig van Beethoven, Franz Schubert, Hector Berlioz, Felix Mendelssohn, Frédéric Chopin, Robert Schumann, Franz Liszt, Richard Wagner, Giuseppe Verdi, Robert Franz, Johannes Brahms, Georges Bizet, Pyotr Ilyich Tchaikovsky, Antonín Dvořák, Edvard Grieg, Vincent d'Indy, Edward MacDowell, Claude Debussy, and Richard Strauss.

In his autobiography, Troubador, he describes how he came to write the book; he refers to himself in the third person: "He actually dreamed of writing books of his own and carried the desire to the point of struggling, almost at the outset, with a humble work on the four huge symphonies of Brahms. In retrospect, it looked like a few drops of ink in the sea and he destroyed it. Then he tried the other extreme and evolved a series of paragraphs, concise, restrained and reverent.  These prose poems to composers, moving from Palestrina to Debussy, he entitled Apostrophes."

Notes
 Kreymborg, Alfred, Troubador: An American Autobiography, 1925; page 65 of the 1957 paperback.

Music books
1910 non-fiction books
Books about musicians